Bingen Cirque is a conspicuous cirque in the steep, eastern rock cliffs of Jokulskarvet Ridge in the Borg Massif of Queen Maud Land. It was mapped by Norwegian cartographers from surveys and from air photos by the Norwegian–British–Swedish Antarctic Expedition (1949–52) and named "Bingen" (the "bin").

References
 

Cirques of Queen Maud Land
Princess Martha Coast